Edward Walsh may refer to:

Sports
 Ed Walsh (1881–1959), Major League pitcher
 Ed Walsh Jr. (1905–1937), Major League pitcher, son of Ed Walsh
 Ed Walsh (ice hockey) (born 1951), retired goaltender
 Eddie Walsh (footballer) (1914–2006), Kerry Gaelic footballer
 Edward Walsh (rugby union) (1861–1939), Irish rugby union player

Journalism
 Edward J. Walsh (journalist) (1942–2014), American political journalist for The Washington Post
 Eddie Walsh (journalist), American syndicated senior foreign correspondent

Other
 Edward Walsh (poet) (1805–1850), Irish poet
Edward J. Walsh (politician) (1890–1934), American lawyer and New York State Assembly member
 Edward M. Walsh (born 1939), founding president of the University of Limerick, Ireland